Duckwall is an unincorporated community in Morgan County in the U.S. state of West Virginia's Eastern Panhandle. It is located along Sleepy Creek east of Johnsons Mill.

References 

Unincorporated communities in Morgan County, West Virginia
Unincorporated communities in West Virginia